Gergő Szekér (born 14 March 1995, Štúrovo) is a Slovak-Hungarian singer, actor, and composer. He is notable for being a competitor in the eighth season of X-Faktor and for participating in A Dal 2019.

Biography 
Szekér was born in 1995, in Štúrovo, Slovakia.

He finished his primary school studies at the Ferenc Liszt Music School, where he specialized in piano and singing. Until 2014, he studied in Szeged, at the László Kelemen School, where he gained stage experience, and thus could perform in the National Theater of Szeged. In 2016, he obtained his degree in acting at the Mária Gór Nagy School.

In the 2018 he took part in the Hungarian version of the talent show X Factor, where Peti Puskás coached him. He was eliminated in the second live show.

On 3 December 2018, it was announced that Szekér would compete in A Dal 2019, the Hungarian national selection process for the Eurovision Song Contest 2019 in Tel Aviv, Israel with the song Madár, repülj!, where he came in 5th place in the final.

Discography

Singles

References

External links

1995 births
Living people
People from Nové Zámky District
Slovak people of Hungarian descent
21st-century Hungarian male singers
21st-century Hungarian actors